Lithuania competed at the 2000 Summer Paralympics in Sydney, Australia.

Medalists

See also
Lithuania at the 2000 Summer Olympics

External links
International Paralympic Committee

References

Nations at the 2000 Summer Paralympics
2000
Paralympics